The M16 was a  spin-stabilized unguided rocket developed by the United States Army during the Second World War. Entering service in April 1945 to replace the earlier fin-stabilised 4.5-inch M8 rocket, it was used late in the war and also during the Korean War before being removed from service.

Development
The M16 was launched from T66 "Honeycomb" 3x8 24-tube launchers, M21 5x5 25-tube launchers, and could also be fired from 60-tube "Hornet's Nest" launchers. The United States Marine Corps developed launching systems for the M16 rocket as well, capable of being fitted to standard 3/4 and 2.5-ton trucks. A version of the M16 rocket for single launchers, the M20, was developed as a derivative; practice rounds designated M17 and M21 were also manufactured.

During the Cold war years, various state and privately owned scientific institutions were engaged in the research and development projects, concerning development and enhancement of the U.S. Army spin-stabilized rockets, to mention California Institute of Technology, North Carolina State College of Agriculture of the University of North Carolina.

Operational history
A unit of "Honeycombs" was deployed to the European Theater of Operations in May 1945, and saw limited action in Czechoslovakia before the end of the war; only being used in a single engagement. Two of five battalions equipped with the M16 were deployed to the Pacific Theater of Operations, being stationed on Okinawa and in the Philippines, however the war ended before these units could see combat. The M16 remained in service with the U.S. Marine Corps following the war, with a single 18-launcher battery equipping each Marine Division; these saw combat service during the Korean War, as did U.S. Army launchers, the M16 fired from the T66 launcher being considered one of the "principal artillery weapons in the Korean War inventory".

Variants  
 M16 (T38E3)
 Baseline version adopted by U.S. Army
 M16E1
 M16 rocket with deeper fuze cavity for V.T. Fuze M402 (Mk 173).
 M16E2
 M16E1 with purge pellets of 411E to eliminate chunks in burning
 M17
 Practice round for M16 rocket.
 M20
 M16 variant with ignition wires attached to spools instead of contact rings.
 M21
 Practice variant of M20 Rocket

Photo Gallery

Launchers
 T66 & T66E2 ("Honeycomb"): Towed, 24 tube. The E2 incorporated multiple improvements such as a new elevation system, blackout lighting, and sights.The 60-tube variant (designation needed), was nicknamed "Hornet's Nest".
 M21 (T123): Towed, 25 tube. Unusual in that it used square, rather than round, tubes.

See also
Katyusha rocket launcher
List of U.S. Army rocket launchers by model number
Multiple rocket launcher
 Nebelwerfer

References

Citations

Bibliography 

 
 
 
 
 

Rocket weapons of the United States
World War II weapons of the United States
California Institute of Technology
Weapons and ammunition introduced in 1945